Project A Part II (aka Jackie Chan’s Project A II; released in the Philippines as Super Fighter) is a 1987 Hong Kong action film starring and directed by Jackie Chan, who also writer with Edward Tang, who also producer with Raymond Chow, Leonard Ho. It is the sequel to the 1983 film Project A. Jackie Chan plays Sergeant Dragon Ma once again, but his co-stars from the previous film, Sammo Hung and Yuen Biao, are absent. The film was released on 19 August 1987.

Plot
Continuing from where the first film left off, the pirates vow that they must kill Dragon Ma for revenge. On recommendation of the Chief of Marine Force, Dragon Ma is transferred to be in charge of the district of Sai Wan after the Superintendent, Chun, is thought to be staging his arrests. Though Chun has an excellent record, the "criminals" he has been engaging are shot and killed, so there is no evidence against him.

Dragon Ma and his subordinates meet Yesan and her cousin, Carina, at a teahouse. He learns that Carina is a member of the Chinese revolutionaries headed by Dr Sun Yat-sen. Dragon identifies himself as the new superintendent of Sai Wan Police Station, after realizing that all of his policemen except one has been taking bribes. Ho, the only upright policeman around, tells them that a gangster named Tiger Ow with gambling dens and other illegal businesses is the kingpin of the town.

As his men at the police station are too cowardly, Dragon is forced to confront Tiger with only Ho and the three friends he brought with him from the Marine Police. Following a big fight where the policemen are badly outnumbered, the Marine Police show up with guns and force the gangsters to surrender. After one last fight with Ow, all the gangsters are sent to prison, inspiring the police at the station to do a better job.

Dragon is put in charge of the Governor's security for a birthday ball he is throwing for his adopted daughter. Chun collaborates with a group of revolutionaries to implicate Dragon in a theft of the Governor's diamond pendant, and Dragon is arrested. After the ball, Carina is kidnapped by agents of the Empress Dowager, who are working with Chun; they trap her in a wardrobe at Yesan's house. Yesan, Li, Ma, and Ho arrive. Li hides but ends up threatened by one of the imperial agents. Ma and Ho, who are handcuffed together, enter the bathroom. While they are in the bathroom, the commissioner arrives.

As Yesan hangs up his uniform, Ma and Ho see the keys to the handcuffs. They break free and hide under the bed, losing the key to the handcuffs. They see the Imperial Agents with Carina in the wardrobe. Yesan and the commissioner sit down to talk. The Commissioner demonstrates how to handcuff two people by handcuffing himself to the armchair but can not break free. Chun arrives to visit Yesan, and the commissioner hides under the bed, where he sees Ma and Ho. Yesan finally gets Chun to get out of her house, when Ma, Ho, Tung and Yesan defeat the Imperial agents. Eventually the Imperial Agents are arrested, the revolutionary chief escapes, and Dragon is handcuffed by Chun so that he can be brought to the main prison. Carina flees town with the help of the revolutionaries. Chun arranges for Dragon to be killed by a prison warden.

The pirates attack both Dragon and Chun with axes, but they are eventually driven off after the police show up. Dragon is handed over to the prison warden, tied up in a sack, and thrown into the sea. The revolutionaries save Dragon and take him back to their hideout above a medicine store, where they try to enlist him. Dragon refuses to actively help them, saying that he is just a Hong Kong cop. The head of the pirates falls sick and the pirates enter the medicine store to ask for some herbs. Dragon intervenes and offers to pay for their medicine, causing the pirates to think much better of him.

The Imperial agents arrive and apprehend most of the revolutionaries, to gain possession of the black book. Dragon helps Yessan and Miss Pak escape while safeguarding the book.  After a frantic run and fight, he defeats them with the help of the pirates.  The Police Commissioner arrives with a huge police cohort and orders the arrest of Superintendent Chun, now fully aware Chun is trying to murder Dragon. Chun tries to run, but a large bamboo-and-wood stage facade falls on Chun while he attempts to retrieve his moneybag. Dragon, on order of the Commissioner, takes charge of the police.

Cast
Jackie Chan – Sergeant Dragon Ma
Maggie Cheung – Yesan / Maggie
Bill Tung – Chief Inspector / Chief Tung
Rosamund Kwan – Miss Pak
 – Superintentant/Inspector Chun
Carina Lau – Carina / Beattie
Ray Lui – Mr. Man Tin-ching
Regina Kent – Regina, Governor’s daughter
Mars – Mars / Jaws
Kenny Ho – Shi King Ho
Božidar Smiljanić - Governor
Yao Lin Chen – Awesome Wolf
Chris Li – Mr. D (Ma's sidekick)
Fan Mei-sheng – Black Bear
Hoi Sang Lee – Choy
Tai Bo – Mr. B
John Cheung – Bodyguard
Chen Ti-ko – Python
Benny Lai – Pirate No.1
Rocky Lai – Pirate No.2
Johnny Cheung – Pirate No.3
Lai Sing-kong – Pirate No.4
Frankie Poon – Pirate No.5
Sun Wong – Sgt. Ching
Wan Fat – Wan Sam Mun
Len Wen-wei – Sung
Ben Lam – Brawns
Lo Wai-kwong – Brains
Anthony Chan – Cop #365
Nicky Li – Hotel Receptionist
Kwan Hoi-san – Chi
Lau Siu-ming – The Prince
Isabela Wong – Winnie Chi 
Ricky Hui – Cop #364
Alan Chui Chung-San – Unknown Cop (Cameo)
Sammo Hung – Fei (Opening Credit Sequence)
Yuen Biao – Captain Tzu (Opening Credit Sequence)
Dick Wei – San Pau (cameo) (Opening Credit Sequence in film)

Production notes
Sammo Hung and Yuen Biao did not appear in the Project A sequel because they were shooting the film Eastern Condors (1987). Ben Lam, Kenny Ho and Chris Li appeared in both films.
The scene in Maggie's house is an homage to the scene in the 1935 Marx Brothers film A Night at the Opera in which several characters were crammed into a small cabin on a ship. The scene in which the wall falls on Jackie but he escapes injury because he is standing exactly where the window of the wall lands is taken from Buster Keaton's Steamboat Bill, Jr.. The handcuff sequence was inspired by a segment Jackie saw on the news magazine 60 Minutes.

Box office
At the Hong Kong box office, the film grossed 31,459,916. In Taiwan, it was the fourth highest-grossing film of 1987, earning  (US$697,097).

In Japan, it was the sixth highest-grossing foreign film of 1987, earning . In South Korea, it was the second highest-grossing film of 1984, with 176,273 ticket sales in Seoul City, equivalent to an estimated .

The film was released in the Philippines by Asia Films Exchange as Super Fighter on 3 December 1987.

Reception
Rotten Tomatoes, a review aggregator, reports that 71% of seven surveyed critics gave the film a positive review; the average rating was 6.5/10.  David Beamish of DVDactive rated it 6/10 stars and recommended it to fans of the first film.  J. Doyle Wallis of DVD Talk rated it 3.5/5 stars and called it "one of the better films in his resume, just not up to the likes of the original film that preceded it."  Mike Pinsky of DVD Verdict called it a "time filler" for Chan that does not live up to the previous film.

Accolades
1988 Hong Kong Film Awards
Won: Best Action Choreography
Nominated: Best Film Editing (Peter Cheung)

See also

Jackie Chan filmography
List of Hong Kong films

References

External links

1987 films
1987 martial arts films
1980s action comedy films
1980s martial arts comedy films
1980s Cantonese-language films
Films directed by Jackie Chan
Golden Harvest films
Hong Kong action comedy films
Hong Kong martial arts comedy films
Hong Kong sequel films
Hong Kong slapstick comedy films
Media Asia films
Police detective films
Pirate films
1980s Hong Kong films